Diphosphoinositol pentakisphosphate kinase 2 is a protein that in humans is encoded by the PPIP5K2 gene.

Function

Inositol phosphates (IPs) and diphosphoinositol phosphates (PP-IPs), also known as inositol pyrophosphates, act as cell signaling molecules. 

HISPPD1 has both IP6 kinase (EC 2.7.4.21) and PP-IP5 (also called IP7) kinase (EC 2.7.4.24) activities that produce the high-energy pyrophosphates PP-IP5 and PP2-IP4 (also called IP8), respectively (Fridy et al., 2007 [PubMed 17690096]).

References

Further reading 

Human proteins